Roger Morève (7 June 1897, in Mézières-en-Brenne – 27 September 1983) was a French politician. He represented the Radical Party in the National Assembly from 1951 to 1958 and was in the Senate from 1959 to 1971.

References

1897 births
1983 deaths
People from Indre
Politicians from Centre-Val de Loire
Radical Party (France) politicians
Deputies of the 2nd National Assembly of the French Fourth Republic
Deputies of the 3rd National Assembly of the French Fourth Republic
French Senators of the Fifth Republic
Senators of Indre
French military personnel of World War I
French Resistance members